The West Coast Negro Baseball Association (WCNBA) was one of the several Negro baseball leagues created during the time organized baseball was segregated.  The WCNBA was organized as a minor league in 1946 by Abe Saperstein and Jesse Owens as a means to provide the west coast with a platform for African-American players.  The league lasted about three months.

League history 

During World War II in the mid-1940s, the African American population grew as wartime jobs demanded workers to relocate to the shipyards and military institutions along the California, Oregon and Washington coasts.  After the war ended in 1945, Eddie Harris and David P. Portlock began the process of organizing a Negro league in the area using the current minor league Pacific Coast League (PCL) stadiums while those teams were on the road. They reached out to Abe Saperstein to assist.  Saperstein already owned a barnstorming team called the Cincinnati Crescents, which he moved to Seattle and renamed them the Seattle Steelheads. He knew Jesse Owens, the track and field athlete and four-time Olympic gold medalist, and asked him to join.  Owens formed the Portland Rosebuds in Oregon. Saperstein was elected league president, Owens vice-president and Portlock secretary.  A 110-game season was planned. However, the league survived for only about three months.  Most teams played under 30 games and the league folded due to "poor attendance, a lack of financing, and difficulty in accessing ballparks." Seattle and Oakland continued the season playing local teams across the midwest.

League franchises 

The league was to be made up of six teams in cities with PCL stadiums. Originally, a team was slated to play in Fresno, a non-PCL city.  They moved their base of operations to San Diego, but did initially play at least one game in Fresno. Oakland far outpaced the rest of the league in the shortened season, with Seattle and San Francisco finishing above .500. San Diego, Portland and Los Angeles rounded out the standings.

External links 

Baseball-Reference (Minors)

References 

Negro baseball leagues
Defunct baseball leagues in the United States
African-American sports history
Sports leagues established in 1946
African-American history of Oregon
African-American history of California
African-American history of Washington (state)
Baseball leagues in California
Baseball leagues in Washington (state)
Baseball leagues in Oregon
Defunct minor baseball leagues in the United States